Pop*Porn is the third studio album by Líbido, released in 2002. With the production of Duane Baron, was recorded and mixed at Panda studios in Perú.

Track listing

2002 albums
Líbido (band) albums